Chorthippus bornhalmi is a species of slant-faced grasshopper in the family Acrididae. It is found in southern Europe and southwest Asia.

References

Further reading

External links

 

Acrididae